CSA Z462, Workplace Electrical Safety Standard is a standard of the Canadian Standards Association. It is based on and was developed in parallel with U.S. National Fire Protection Association (NFPA) standard NFPA 70E, Standard for Electrical Safety in the Workplace.  Attempts have been made to harmonize Z462 with NFPA 70E as much as practicable for Canadian workplaces.

CSA Z462 is the Canadian standard that addresses electrical safety requirements for employees. It provides guidance on the assessment of electrical hazards and design of safe work spaces around electrical power systems. It stipulates requirements for identifying hazardous equipment and for the development of safe work procedures around this equipment. This standard also gives guidance to electrical workers on the selection of personal protective equipment and protective clothing for protection from electrical arc flash hazards. CSA Z462-18 is the fourth and most current edition of the standard.

See also
 Lockout-Tagout
 Canadian Electrical Code

References

External links 
Z462-08 Workplace Electrical Safety Standard
Canadian Standards Association
The National Fire Protection Association

Electrical safety